Nö Sleep at All is the third live album by the band Motörhead, released in October 1988 by GWR Records, their only live album and last release with the label as legal matters continued between the parties.

Background
Motörhead and their record label GWR disagreed over the choice of a single from the album; the band wanted to release "Traitor," which had appeared on their most recent LP Rock 'N' Roll, while the label argued for the Motörhead classic "Ace of Spades".  This led to a lawsuit and a parting of the ways. In the book Overkill: The Untold Story of Motörhead, author Joel McIver sums up the band's perilous situation:

Guitarist Würzel is quoted in the insert of the re-mastered CD release, saying;

To promote the album, the band engaged in a tour of North America, opening for Slayer. Lemmy admits that the album was a mistake and failed sales-wise, but considers it to be "all right" and believes it was the mix that let them down, explaining:

Release
EMI Greece pressed a 7" vinyl called "Live in Athens", featuring "Acropolis (Metropolis)" on the A-side and "Orgasmatron" on the B-side; it was shrinkwrapped to the first 1,000 copies of the album. The songs had been taped for the Greek Antenna Metal Show, for which Lemmy retitled "Metropolis" to suit the occasion.

Track listing 

NOTE: "Metropolis" was recorded on 23 December in 1987 at the Brixton Academy which was later released on Live at Brixton '87

Personnel

Motörhead
 Lemmy – lead vocals, bass
 Phil "Wizzö" Campbell – guitar
 Michael "Würzel" Burston – guitars
 Phil "Philthy Animal" Taylor – drums

Production
Guy Bidmead - producer
Richard Dowling - engineer
Steve Orchard - engineer
PRT Studios, London - mixing
Motörhead - executive producers
John F McGill - design
Ray Palmer - photography
Joe Petagno - Snaggletooth

Charts

References

External links 
 Motörhead official website

Motörhead live albums
1988 live albums
Castle Communications live albums